Flitcroft may refer to the following people:

David Flitcroft (born 1974), English assistant football manager and former professional footballer, brother of Garry
Garry Flitcroft (born 1972), English football manager and former professional footballer
Henry Flitcroft (1697–1769), English architect in the Palladian style
John Flitcroft (1914–1994), British cleric and academic
Maurice Flitcroft (1929–2007), British amateur golfer and hoaxer

See also:
Flitcroft's case